Enea may be:

Enea (moth), a genus of moths of the family Noctuidae
Enea S.A., a Polish power company
Enea Bastianini, an Italian motorcycle racer
Enea Hodoș, an Austro-Hungarian and Romanian writer and folklorist
Enea, from the eponymous Aeneas, alternative name for Europe

ENEA may be:

ENEA (Italy), the Italian National Agency for New Technologies, Energy and the Sustainable economic development
ENEA AB, a Swedish information technology company